A fractal curve is, loosely, a mathematical curve whose shape retains the same general pattern of irregularity, regardless of how high it is magnified, that is, its graph takes the form of a fractal. In general, fractal curves are nowhere rectifiable curves — that is, they do not have finite length — and every subarc longer than a single point has infinite length.

A famous example is the boundary of the Mandelbrot set.

Fractal curves in nature

Fractal curves and fractal patterns are widespread, in nature, found in such places as broccoli, snowflakes, feet of geckos, frost crystals, and lightning bolts.

See also Romanesco broccoli, dendrite crystal, trees, fractals, Hofstadter's butterfly, Lichtenberg figure,  and self-organized criticality.

Dimensions of a fractal curve

Most of us are used to mathematical curves having dimension one, but as a general rule, fractal curves have different dimensions, also see also fractal dimension and list of fractals by Hausdorff dimension.

Relationships of fractal curves to other fields

Starting in the 1950s Benoit Mandelbrot and others have studied self-similarity of fractal curves, and have applied theory of fractals to modelling natural phenomena. Self-similarity occurs, and analysis of these patterns has found fractal curves in such diverse fields as

 economics,
 fluid mechanics,
 geomorphology
 human physiology, and,
 linguistics.

As examples, "landscapes" revealed by microscopic views of surfaces in connection with Brownian motion, vascular networks, and shapes of polymer molecules all relate to fractal curves.

Examples

 Blancmange curve
 Coastline paradox
 De Rham curve
 Dragon curve
 Fibonacci word fractal
 Koch snowflake
 Boundary of the Mandelbrot set
 Menger sponge
 Peano curve
 Sierpiński triangle
 Trees
 Natural fractals
 Weierstrass function

See also

 The Beauty of Fractals
 Fractal antenna
 Fractal expressionism
 Fractal landscape
 Hexaflake
 Mosely snowflake
 Newton fractal
 Orbit trap
 Quasicircle
 The Fractal Geometry of Nature

References

External links and references

 Wolfram math on fractal curves
 The Fractal Foundation's homepage
 fractalcurves.com
 Making a Kock Snowflake, from Khan Academy
 Area of a Koch Snowflake, from Khan Academy
 Youtube on space-filling curves
 Youtube on the Dragon Curve

 
Types of functions